The Victoria Theater is a theater located on 125th Street in the Harlem neighborhood of the borough of Manhattan in New York City. It was designed in 1917 by Thomas W. Lamb, a notable and prolific theater architect of the era, for the Loew's Corporation.

The Loew's Victoria Theater, as it was known until 1977, opened as a 2,394-seat, luxury Vaudeville and motion picture theater. Typical of movie palaces of its era, it contained a stage and backstage dressing rooms and provisions for live music, including an organ. It cost $250,000 to build and was hailed “as one of the largest and most beautiful theaters in greater N.Y.” by a contemporary publication. When the Victoria was built, it joined many other Harlem theaters including the Proctor, Hammerstein Opera House, the Alhambra as well as the nearby Apollo, then the Hurtig & Seamon's New (Burlesque) Theater.

In 1977, the Harlem Community Development Corporation acquired the building.

The Victoria has experienced numerous changes since its opening, the most radical being its conversion to a multi-screen movie theater; in 1987, five movie theaters were created from the large auditorium, mezzanine and stage areas. The theater closed as a cinema in 1989, though a 400-seat venue was left intact in the orchestra, at which the original Harlem company of Godspell, which drew major newspaper and television network broadcast coverage, ran for approximately a year in the 1996/97 season. In 2005 several proposals for redevelopment were made. Only two proposals call for reusing the theater's interior, which has angered some community leaders, according to the New York Times.

The new Victoria Theater project, developed by the Lam Group and Exact Capital, designed by architect Ariel Aufgang and interiors by AJC Design, began construction in April 2017 and was scheduled to open in the spring of 2019.  The completed 400,000-square-foot structure will have 191 mixed-income rental apartments; a 210-room Marriott Renaissance hotel; about 25,000 square feet of retail; and another 25,000 square feet of cultural and arts space. This project has suffered numerous delays and was forced to seek refinancing.  After a very long process it appears that refinancing was secured in the Spring of 2022. As of September 2022, some portions of the building are open, but the hotel and theater are not operational.

References

External links

 Photo at Wired New York

Movie palaces
Victoria Theater
Harlem
Loew's Theatres buildings and structures
Thomas W. Lamb buildings